Academy Fantasia, Season 5 is the fifth season of Academy Fantasia which premiered on True Visions in May 2008.

Auditions
There were three channel for auditions, Live, Online and Academic institutions audition. The contestants were required to between the ages of 15 to 25 years old who are not embedded with music recording contracts.

The Live Auditions were held in the following cities:
 The South district, Surat Thani
 The Northeast district, Nakhon Ratchasima
 The North district, Chiangmai
 The Center district, Bangkok

Concert summaries

Top 16 - Semi-finals (Week 1)

Top 14 - Semi-finals (Week 2)

Group Performances
 Females - "กลับมาหาเพื่อน" (Seven)

Finalists

In order of elimination
(ages stated are at time of competition)

Summaries

Elimination chart

Professional trainers
Principal

Voice Trainers

Dance Trainers

Acting Trainers

Judges

References

Academy Fantasia